Kolesov (from колесо meaning wheel) is a Russian masculine surname, its feminine counterpart is Kolesova. It may refer to:

Alexandr Kolesov (1922–1994), Soviet military officer
Anatoly Kolesov (1938–2012), Russian wrestler and coach
Anatoly Kolesov (cyclist) (born 1931), Soviet cyclist
Gavril Kolesov (born 1979), Russian draughts player
Gordey Kolesov (born 2008), the winner of the 2015 Talent Show
Nikolai Kolesov (1956–1998), Russian football player
Oleh Kolesov (born 1969), Ukrainian football coach and a former goalkeeper
Yelena Kolesova (1920–1942), Spetnaz partisan unit commander during World War II

Russian-language surnames